Gordon Nutt (8 November 1932 – 25 February 2014) was an English professional footballer who played as a winger. Nutt played in the Football League for Coventry City, Cardiff City, Arsenal and Southend United, in the Netherlands for PSV Eindhoven, and in Australia for Sydney Croatia and Manly-Warringah.

Career

Playing career
Born in South Yardley, Nutt played youth football for Sheldon Town. He then went on to Coventry City in 1951, scoring 11 goals in 76 appearances over the next three seasons. In 1954 he signed for Cardiff City, where he spent one season, making 17 appearances. In 1955 he signed for Arsenal. Nutt spent a total of 5 seasons with the club, scoring 10 goals in 51 appearances.

After leaving Arsenal, Nutt joined Southend United, and then Dutch club PSV, where he spent one season, scoring 5 goals in 31 appearances. He later played for Australian clubs Sydney Croatia and Manly United FC all in all.

Coaching career
Nutt was also a coach at Sydney Croatia in 1966 and an assistant coach at Manly-Warringah in 1969.

Later life and death
Nutt died on 25 February 2014, in Tasmania, at the age of 81.

Further reading

References

1932 births
2014 deaths
English footballers
Coventry City F.C. players
Cardiff City F.C. players
Arsenal F.C. players
Southend United F.C. players
PSV Eindhoven players
Sydney United 58 FC players
Manly United FC players
English Football League players
Footballers from Birmingham, West Midlands
Association football wingers
English expatriate footballers
English expatriate sportspeople in the Netherlands
Expatriate footballers in the Netherlands
English expatriate sportspeople in Australia
Expatriate soccer players in Australia
Expatriate soccer managers in Australia
Sydney United 58 FC managers